Mary Antin (born Maryashe Antin; June 13, 1881 – May 15, 1949) was an American author and immigration rights activist. She is best known for her 1912 autobiography The Promised Land, an account of her emigration and subsequent Americanization.

Life
Mary Antin was the second of six children born to Israel and Esther Weltman Antin, a Jewish family living in Polotsk, in the Vitebsk Governorate of the Russian Empire (present-day Belarus). Israel Antin emigrated to Boston in 1891, and three years later he sent for Mary and her mother and siblings.

She married Amadeus William Grabau, a geologist, in 1901, and moved to New York City where she attended Teachers College of Columbia University and Barnard College. Antin is best known for her 1912 autobiography The Promised Land, which describes her public school education and assimilation into American culture, as well as life for Jews in Czarist Russia. After its publication, Antin lectured on her immigrant experience to many audiences across the country.

During World War I, while she campaigned for the Allied cause, her husband's pro-German activities precipitated their separation and her physical breakdown. Amadeus was forced to leave his post at Columbia University to work in China, where he became "the father of Chinese geology." She was never physically strong enough to visit him there.

During World War II, Amadeus was interned by the Japanese and died shortly after his release in 1946. Mary Antin died of cancer on May 15, 1949.

Legacy
She is commemorated on the Boston Women's Heritage Trail.

Quotations

Notes

Further reading

External links
 
 
 Encyclopædia Britannica's Guide to Women's History at search.eb.com
 Vom Ghetto ins Land der Verheissung, 1913 (digitized version)
 Pamela S. Nadell, Mary Antin, Jewish Women Encyclopedia
 
 
 
 The Jewish Women's Archive entry on Mary Antin
 Monica Rüthers, Between Threat and Hope. Migration to the New World. Mary Antin’s Account, in: Key Documents of German-Jewish History, June 27, 2017. 

1881 births
1949 deaths
People from Polotsk
People from Polotsky Uyezd
Belarusian Jews
Emigrants from the Russian Empire to the United States
American people of Belarusian-Jewish descent
New York (state) Progressives (1912)
20th-century American memoirists
American women memoirists
Jewish American writers
Jewish women writers
People from South End, Boston
Teachers College, Columbia University alumni
Barnard College alumni
Deaths from cancer in New York (state)